Empress Xiaochengren (3 February 1654 – 6 June 1674), of the Manchu Plain Yellow Banner Hešeri clan, was a posthumous name bestowed to the wife and first empress consort of Xuanye, the Kangxi Emperor. She was empress consort of Qing from 1665 until her death in 1674. Although her marriage was a purely political one, the Kangxi Emperor was very fond of her and left the position of empress vacant for about three years after her death.

Life

Family background
Empress Xiaochengren's personal name was not recorded in history.

 Father: Gabula (d.1681), served as a first rank military official, and held the title of a first class duke
 Paternal grandfather: Sonin (1601–1667), served as one of the Four Regents of the Kangxi Emperor, and held the title of a first class duke 
 Third paternal uncle: Songgotu (1636–1703)
 Fifth paternal uncle: Xinyu, held the title of a first class earl
 Sixth paternal uncle: Fabao, held the title of a first class duke
 Two younger brothers
 Second younger brother: Changtai, served as a first rank military official, and held the title of a first class duke.
 Three sisters
 younger sister: Consort Ping (d.1696)

Lady Hešeri's grandfather, Sonin (索尼; 1601–1667), served as one of the Four Regents of the Kangxi Emperor, and held the title of first class duke. Her father, Gabula (噶布喇; d.1681), served as a military general and also held a title of duke. One of her aunts married with the grandson of Nurhaci, Yolo (岳樂; 1625–1689), Prince of the first rank (和碩安親王); another aunt married with the grandson of Nurhaci, the son of Dodo (多鐸), Cani (察尼; 1640–1688), Prince of the third rank (多羅貝勒).

Shunzhi era
The future Empress Xiaochengren was born on the 17th day of the 12th lunar month in the tenth year of the reign of the Shunzhi Emperor, which translates to 3 February 1654 in the Gregorian calendar.

Kangxi era
In October or November 1665, Lady Hešeri married the Kangxi Emperor and became empress consort because her powerful family could help the emperor on his rules. Although it was a purely political marriage, the Kangxi Emperor was very fond of the Empress. On 4 January 1670, she gave birth to a son, Chenghu, who would die prematurely on 3 March 1672. The death of Prince Chenghu hit the Empress very much, and she became very sick. The Emperor who was staying in Chicheng heard that Lady Hešeri was seriously ill, and he set off for Beijing immediately to take care of Lady Hešeri. After the Empress recovered, she became pregnant again.

The Empress died on 6 June 1674 shortly after giving birth to the emperor's second son, Yunreng. The emperor was extremely sad about the Empress's death, so he made her son the crown prince. After her death, the Kangxi Emperor left the position of empress vacant for about three years before instating one of his consorts, Lady Niohuru, as Empress, on 18 September 1677.

Titles
 During the reign of the Shunzhi Emperor (r. 1643–1661):
 Lady Hešeri (from 3 February 1654)
 During the reign of the Kangxi Emperor (r. 1661–1722):
 Empress (from October/November 1665)
 Empress Renxiao (from 1674)
 During the reign of the Yongzheng Emperor (r. 1722–1735):
 Empress Renxiaoren (from June 1723)
 Empress Xiaochengren (from July 1723)

Issue
 As Empress:
 Chenghu ( (嫡长子); 4 January 1670 – 3 March 1672), the Kangxi Emperor's second son
 Yunreng ( (嫡次子); 6 June 1674 – 27 January 1725), the Kangxi Emperor's seventh (second) son, Crown Prince for his lifetime, posthumously honoured as Prince Limi of the First Rank

In fiction and popular culture
 Portrayed by Li Chentao in Kangxi Dynasty (2001)
 Portrayed by Zhou Jia in Huang Taizi Mishi (2004)
 Portrayed by Chae Rim in Secret History of Kangxi (2006)
 Portrayed by Maggie Shiu in Palace (2011)
 Portrayed by Zhang Weina in Legend of Dragon Pearl (2017)

See also
 Royal and noble ranks of the Qing dynasty

Notes

References
 
 

1654 births
1674 deaths
Deaths in childbirth
Qing dynasty empresses
Manchu nobility
17th-century Chinese women
17th-century Chinese people
Consorts of the Kangxi Emperor
Hešeri clan